Oh Hello or Oh Hellos may refer to 

Hello, a common salutation or greeting
The Oh, Hello Show, an American comedy act composed of John Mulaney and Nick Kroll
The Oh Hellos, an American indie folk rock duo